Proteroiulus fuscus is a species of millipede in the family Blaniulidae which can be found everywhere in Europe except for Albania, Andorra, Liechtenstein, Moldova, Monaco, Romania, San Marino, Vatican City, all states of former Yugoslavia and some European islands.

Description
It have dark or brownish coloured ozadenes and have 6-14 setae which is a bit longer than its metazonite.

References

Julida
Animals described in 1857
Millipedes of Europe